Fenzhongsi station() is a subway station on Line 10 of the Beijing Subway. The station opened on 30 December 2012. The station is located in Fengtai District's Fenzhongsi, after which it is named.

Station Layout 
The station has an underground island platform.

Exits 
There are 4 exits, lettered A, B, C, and D. Exits A and C are accessible.

References

Beijing Subway stations in Fengtai District
Railway stations in China opened in 2012